Boston Mill is a Cuyahoga Valley Scenic Railroad train station in Boston Township, Ohio, with a street address in Peninsula, Ohio. It is located at the intersection of Riverview Road and Boston Mills Road in the Cuyahoga Valley National Park.

History

Initially a stop on the Valley Railway, trains began regular service at Boston in 1880 as a flag stop. The station building was moved to Peninsula in 1968, becoming the Peninsula Depot. A new station was constructed by the National Park Service south of the old depot location to serve the Cuyahoga Valley Scenic Railroad.

References

External links
Boston Mill Station — National Park Service

Cuyahoga Valley Scenic Railroad stations
Former Baltimore and Ohio Railroad stations
Former railway stations in Ohio
Railway stations in the United States opened in 1880